A Life for Do is a 1954 West German drama film directed by Gustav Ucicky and starring Hans Söhnker, Paola Loew and Heidi Becker. It was shot at the Tempelhof Studios in West Berlin and on location around Lucerne and Zurich. The film's sets were designed by the art directors Emil Hasler and Walter Kutz.

Plot
Do lives with her foster father on a farm in South Africa. Concerned that she is developing romantic feelings for him he sends her away to school in Switzerland.

Cast
Hans Söhnker as Thomas
Paola Loew as Do
Heidi Becker as Klein Do
Charles Regnier as Maurice
Renate Schacht as Vivian
Gisela Trowe as Marguerite
Michael Cramer as Konrad
Paul Esser as Onkel Karl
Erna Haffner as Tante Anni
Brigitte Rau as Gritli
Peter Mosbacher as Kapellmeister
Maria Wimmer as Vera
Iwa Wanja as Wirtin

References

External links

1954 drama films
German drama films
West German films
Films directed by Gustav Ucicky
Films set in South Africa
Films set in Switzerland
Films shot in Switzerland
Films shot at Tempelhof Studios
German black-and-white films
1950s German films
1950s German-language films